Ibrahim Naʼiddah (1953 – 29 January 2022) was a Nigerian politician who represented Gusau East on the Zamfara State House of Assembly until his death.

References 

1953 births
2022 deaths
Members of the Zamfara State House of Assembly
People from Zamfara State
21st-century Nigerian politicians